Pycnarmon quinquepuncta is a moth in the family Crambidae. It was described by Charles Swinhoe in 1904. It is found on Borneo.

The wings are semihyaline (almost glass like) pale yellow, the forewings with three large black spots in the shape of a triangle, one below the middle of the costa and the other two above the hindmargin. The hindwings have two similar spots.

References

Spilomelinae
Moths described in 1904
Moths of Borneo